Repp is a surname. Notable people with the name include:

 Corrina Repp, American vocalist, guitarist, and songwriter from Portland, Oregon
 Ed Earl Repp (1901–1979), American writer, screenwriter and novelist
 Pierre Repp (1909–1986), French humorist and actor
 Ray Repp (1942-2020), American Roman Catholic singer-songwriter
 Roy Repp (1882-1934), Australian stunt driver
 Stafford Repp (1918–1974), American character actor
 Þorleifur Repp (1794–1857), Icelandic scholar and philologist